Sayyid Abdurahman Imbichikoya Thangal Al-Aydarusi Al-Azhari ( السيد عبد الرحمان العيدروس الأزهري تنكل), also known as Azhari Thangal (അസ്ഹരി തങ്ങള്‍)  was the President of Samastha Kerala Jamiat-ul-Ulema, the largest Muslim organisation in Kerala, India. He was selected as the vice president in 1993 and two years later appointed as the President following the death of K K Aboobacker Hazrath. He was nominated by Shams-ul-Ulama E. K. Aboobacker Musliyar.

Early life and family 
Azhari Thangal's father is the first scholar from Sayyid family in Kerala to get Al-Baqavi graduation from Baqiyat Salihat Arabic College. Azhari Thangal is a direct descendant of the Islamic prophet, Muhammad, through his grandson Husayn. He is survived by eleven children and three wives.

Education and Career 
He first learned religion from his father, studied in Dars at Orumanayur, Kallor, Njamanangad, Vailathur Masjids. He served as Mudaris (preacher teacher)  at Thalakkadathur Juma Masjid. He completed degree Baqavi from Baqiyat Salihat Arabic College, Vellore,Tamil Nadu in 1951 and Qasimi from Darul Uloom Deoband, Uttar Pradesh in 1956. He left for Egypt for further studies and obtained his Al-Azhar degree from Al Azhar University. While pursuing post Graduation in Cairo University after completion of Librarian degree, he moved to Libya for joining as faculty in  The Islamic University of Asaied Mohamed Bin Ali Al Sanussi. Later he moved to Saudi Arabia and served as professor for more than 20 years under Saudi Government and Riyadh University colleges  at Khulays and Wadi Addawasir respectively.

Writings
Azhari Thangal's books include:
 Al Arab Wal Arabiyya(Arabs And Arabic Language)(Arabic: العرب والعربية )

 Min Nawabigi Ulemai Malaibar (Arabic: من نوابغ علماء مليبار) 
 Abu Nawas wa hayathuhu (Arabic: أبو نواس وحياته) 
 Thariq nnahvi wa thathawwuruhu (Arabic: تاريخ النحو وتطوّره) 
 Majmau thareeq Rasoolinalazhlam-Swallallahu alaihi wasallam (Arabic: مجمع تاريخ رسولنا الأعظم -صلى الله عليه وسلم) 
 Athasawuful islami (Arabic: التصوف الإسلامي) 
 Mojizu Thareekh Al Adabil Arabi Wadda’wath Al Islamiyya fee Malaibar (Arabic: موجز تاريخ الأدب العربي والدعوة الإسلامية في مليبار) 
 Qissath Malik Malaibar lladi I’tahnaqa  al Islam (Arabic: قصة ملك مليبار الذي اعتنق الإسلام) 
 Thareeq Sheikh Malik bin deenar lladi nashara al Islam fee Malaibar (Arabic: تاريخ الشيخ مالك بن دينار الذي نشر الإسلام في مليبار) 
 Athasawwufu  Saheeh wal Musawwafa (Arabic: التصوف الصحيح والمتصوفة) 
 Muqthasaru Hayathi Shamsul Ulema (Arabic: مختصر حياة شمس العلماء) 
 Thareeq sayyid Alavi Mampuarmi (Arabic: تاريخ السيد علوي المنفرمي)
 Annashathu Deeni fil Hind (Arabic: النشاط الديني في الهند) 
 Alfathahul mubeeni ala sharhi fathahul muheen (Arabic: الفتح المبين على شرح فتح المعين)

Demise
Azhari Thangal died on 22_November_2015   at his residence in Valanchery. His Maqam (shrine) is located in Kolamangalam.

Memorial
Azhari Thangal Qutub khana (Library) is opened by Sayed Hyderali Shihab Thangal , nearer to his Maqam (shrine).

References

1924 births
2015 deaths
Islamic religious leaders
Indian Sunni Muslim scholars of Islam
Kerala Sunni-Shafi'i scholars
Saudi Arabian Sunni Muslim scholars of Islam
People from Malappuram
People from Thrissur
Cairo University alumni
Al-Azhar University alumni
Islam in Kerala